Gizem Bozkurt (born 23 May 1993) is a Turkish female swimmer competing in freestyle and mostly in the medley as well as relay events. Currently, she is in the prep class of Özyeğin University in Istanbul.

A member of Fenerbahçe Swimming in Istanbul, she is holder of many national records in various medlay and relay swimming disciplines.

She competed at the 2010 Summer Youth Olympics held in Singapore. Participated in three events, her best result was the eighth place in 200m individual medley, for which she set also a new national record.

She won a bronze medal in 4 × 100 m freestyle relay at the 2013 Mediterranean Games setting also a national record with her teammates in Mersin, Turkey. Bozkurt took three gold, one silver and one bronze medal at the 2013 Islamic Solidarity Games held in Palembang, Indonesia.

Achievements

See also
 Turkish women in sports

References

1993 births
Place of birth missing (living people)
Turkish female swimmers
Turkish female freestyle swimmers
Turkish female medley swimmers
Fenerbahçe swimmers
Özyeğin University alumni
Living people
Swimmers at the 2010 Summer Youth Olympics
Mediterranean Games bronze medalists for Turkey
Swimmers at the 2013 Mediterranean Games
Swimmers at the 2018 Mediterranean Games
Mediterranean Games medalists in swimming
Islamic Solidarity Games competitors for Turkey
Islamic Solidarity Games medalists in swimming
21st-century Turkish women